The Presidential Palace, located in Vilnius Old Town, is the official office of the president of Lithuania. The palace dates back to the 14th century and during its history it has undergone various reconstructions, supervised by prominent architects, including Laurynas Gucevičius and Vasily Stasov. In 1997 the palace  became the official seat of the president of Lithuania.

History

 

The palace traces its history back to the 14th century, when Jogaila, the grand duke of Lithuania, issued an edict donating land in the city to the Vilnius Diocese, for this reason the palace is sometimes referred to as the Bishops' Palace. Construction of the palace took place in the late 14th century under the auspices of the first Bishop of Vilnius, Andrzej Jastrzębiec, and over succeeding generations, the building was gradually enlarged and renovated. During the Renaissance, the palace was once again renovated, and parks and gardens surrounding the building were expanded.

As the 18th century unfolded, a number of dramatic events in the palace's history took place: the last Bishop of Vilnius lived in the palace, Lithuania was annexed by the Russian Empire, and the building itself was badly damaged by two major fires in 1737 and 1748. The palace was reconstructed in 1750 under the supervision of the architect Laurynas Gucevičius. After its reconstruction, the palace was used as a residence for emperors, kings and noblemen. During 1796, Tsar Paul I lived at the palace. During the course of the 19th century, the palace served as a residence for several Imperial Russian governors, such as Mikhail Muravyov, nicknamed "The Hangman". It was also visited by Louis XVIII, the future king of France, in 1804.

In 1812, both the Russian Tsar Alexander I and the French Emperor Napoleon used the palace as their residence. During Napoleon's invasion of Russia, he organized military operations and Lithuanian army units from this palace, including five regiments of infantry, four cavalry regiments, and the National Guard of Vilnius. He received Lithuanian noblemen, newly appointed officials of the administration, and other dignitaries in this palace as well. After Napoleon's defeat in 1812, the palace was used for ceremonial proposes; it was here that then-general Mikhail Kutuzov was awarded Russia's highest military award – the Order of St. George. During 1824–1834, the pqlace was reconstructed by the prominent St. Petersburg architect Vasily Stasov in the Empire style, under supervision of Karol Podczaszyński. Stasov's reconstruction of the palace has remained to this day.

After Lithuania regained its independence in 1918, the palace housed the Ministry of Foreign Affairs and the ELTA news agency until it ended up in Poland in 1920. It was restored in the 1930s by Stefan Narębski. After the Second World War, the palace served as the Military Officers Centre; later it housed various Lithuanian artists. The palace was gradually adapted for use as a presidential office, and since 1997 it has served as the official office of the president of Lithuania. Currently, adaptations are underway to expand the palace's functions to also serve as the president's official residence. A flag displaying the coat of arms of the president is hoisted when the president is present in the palace or in the city.

See also
 Historical Presidential Palace, Kaunas

Notes

References

 Vilniaus architektūra. Vilnius, 1982
 Prezidento Rūmų istorija
 Virtual tour of the Palace

External links

 Institution of the President of the Republic of Lithuania
 Prezidentūra atvėrė duris paprastiems mirtingiesiems

Houses completed in the 15th century
Government buildings completed in 1834
Palaces in Vilnius
Presidential residences
Neoclassical architecture in Lithuania
Neoclassical palaces
Vasily Stasov buildings and structures
Royal residences in Lithuania
Official residences in Lithuania